The Blackberry Jams is a collection of private recordings made by Jason Becker between 1987 and 1988.

Track listing
All songs written by Jason Becker except where noted

Musicians
 Jason Becker - Composer, Multi-Instruments
 Marty Friedman - Guitar, Keyboards

Production
 Mike Bemesderfer - Digital Mastering, Digital Restoration, Flute, Wind Controller
 Mike Varney - Executive Producer
 George Bellas - Booklet Design
 Gary Becker - Cover Art, Lettering, Photography
 Robert Becker - Photography
 Pat Johnson - Photography
 Ross Pelton - Photography

References

 Guitar9 Web page on the record, accessed Nov 29, 2006

Blackberry Jams
2003 compilation albums
Shrapnel Records albums